Robert Ferguson Legget  (September 29, 1904 – April 17, 1994) was a civil engineer, historian and non-fiction writer. He is internationally known for his contributions to engineering, geology and building research and standardization. He is credited with the establishment of co-operation among Canadian geotechnical engineers, geologists and pedologists.

Life

Legget was born in Liverpool, England, to Donald Thompson Legget and his wife Mary, both of whom were of Scottish descent. He was educated at the Merchant Taylors' Boys' School, Crosby. He studied Civil Engineering and obtained a BEng (Hons) in 1925, and MEng 1927, from the University of Liverpool. He was initially employed as an engineer on the Lochaber Water Power Scheme in Scotland. He then emigrated to Canada in 1929, working for the Power Corporation of Canada.

In 1936, he began teaching at Queen's University and the University of Toronto. He left teaching in 1947 to establish and serve as director of the National Research Council of Canada's new Division of Building Research. He held this position until he retired in 1969. Part of his legacy there was to establish a National Building Code that was respected throughout all of Canada, as opposed to the multitude of inconsistent local codes that were prevalent in 1947.

Around 1945, after World War II, Leggat shaped the Environmental Conservation movement in Ontario by spearheading the Guelph Conference, the Ganaraska Study and the Conservation Authorities Act of Ontario (1946). He also was a founder, in 1962, of the Canadian Permafrost Conferences.

He was the founding President of the Canadian Academy of Engineering.

Between 1959 and 1960, Legget was the chairman of the Engineering Geology Division of the Geological Society of America (GSA). He served as GSA president in 1966.

In 1971 he received an honorary doctorate (DEng) from the University of Liverpool. In 1977 he received the Sir John Kennedy Medal.

After he retired, Dr. Legget wrote many books on the history of transportation in Canada including Ottawa Waterway: Gateway to A Continent, Rideau Waterway, Canals of Canada, The Seaway, and others, and he was a contributor to the Dictionary of Canadian Biography.

Legget died in Ottawa at the age of 89. His wife, Mary Free, had died in 1984. They had one son.

Philanthropy
The Legget Endowment Fund is used by the Conservation Foundation on an annual basis for otherwise-unfunded current needs in the Rideau Valley.

Publications
Editor of Soils in Canada
General editor of the Canadian Building Series, published by University of Toronto Press
"The Region and the City." in Planning Canadian Towns and Cities (University of Toronto, Extension Department, 1944, vol. 2)
Rideau Waterway (1955), (revised 1972) – history of the Rideau Canal
Ottawa Waterway, Gateway to a Continent (1975)
Canals of Canada (1975)
Glacial Till (1976)
Handbook of Geology in Civil Engineering (1983) with P.F. Karrow
Railways of Canada(1973)

Honours, awards and legacy
Recognized by 13 honorary degrees including;
 1963, an honorary Doctorate of Science by the University of Waterloo
 1969, an honorary Doctorate of Science by the University of Western Ontario
 1971, an honorary Doctorate of Engineering by the University of Liverpool
 1972, an honorary Doctorate of Science by Concordia University
Honours
 made an honorary member of the American Underground Construction Association
 received the Royal Bank Award
 made an Honorary Life Member of the Rideau Valley Conservation Authority
 the Canadian Geotechnical Society awards the R.F. Legget Medal as its highest honour
 1967, invested as an Officer of the Order of Canada
 1988, elected to the National Academy of Engineering
 1989, promoted to Companion of the Order of Canada
Awards
 1972, awarded the Logan Medal by the Geological Association of Canada
 1974, awarded the Claire P. Holdredge Award by Association of Environmental and Engineering Geologists
 1977, awarded the William Smith Medal by the Geological Society of London
 Archives

References

External links
The Canadian Encyclopedia
Robert F. Legget Endowment Fund
Heritage of Engineering Geology Division, Geological Society of America 1940s to 1990
Claire P. Holdredge Award
AUA Honorary Members
Canadian General Standards Board 1934–1999
Earth Science in the City: A Reader
Rideau Waterway (Paperback)
University of Waterloo Honorary degrees
University of Western Ontario Honorary degrees

1904 births
1994 deaths
Alumni of the University of Liverpool
Anglo-Scots
Canadian environmentalists
Canadian civil engineers
20th-century Canadian geologists
Canadian science writers
Canadian philanthropists
Academic staff of the University of Toronto
Companions of the Order of Canada
British emigrants to Canada
Fellows of the Royal Society of Canada
Fellows of the Engineering Institute of Canada
Writers from Ottawa
Canadian people of Scottish descent
Academics from Liverpool
Logan Medal recipients
20th-century philanthropists
Presidents of the Geological Society of America
People educated at Merchant Taylors' Boys' School, Crosby